Reina Nagashima (born 12 September 1998) is a Japanese professional footballer who plays as a defender for WE League club Urawa Reds.

Club career 
Nagashima made her WE League debut on 12 September 2021.

References 

WE League players
1998 births
Urawa Red Diamonds Ladies players
Japanese women's footballers
Living people
Association football people from Saitama Prefecture
Women's association football defenders